The Gugl Games, formerly known as the Gugl-Meeting, is the largest one-day athletics meet in Austria, and is held at the Linzer Stadion in Linz. Founded in 1988 the Gugl-Meeting was an IAAF Grand Prix-status event from 1994 onwards and has changed to EAA Premium status in 2006. Many major athletic stars have participated in the Gugl-Meeting, including Carl Lewis, Colin Jackson, Allen Johnson, Marion Jones, Iván Pedroso, Maria de Lurdes Mutola, Javier Sotomayor. The Linz track is famous for fast 100-m sprint and excellent long jump performances.

On 20 August 2006, Israeli newspaper Ynet revealed that the competition had not accepted European Pole vaulting champion, Aleksandr Averbukh, due to his Israeli nationality.

After a four-year hiatus, the meet restarted under its new name in 2012 and was held over two days. The 2015 edition was cancelled.

Meet Records

Men

Women

See also
Gugl Indoor Meeting

References

Gugl-Meeting (Outdoor) at the German Wikipedia

External links
 Homepage Gugl Games

Sports competitions in Linz
Annual track and field meetings
Athletics competitions in Austria
Recurring sporting events established in 1988
IAAF Grand Prix
IAAF World Outdoor Meetings